The 2002 Clásica de Almería was the 17th edition of the Clásica de Almería cycle race and was held on 3 March 2002. The race was won by Massimo Strazzer.

General classification

References

2002
2002 in road cycling
2002 in Spanish sport